Kulnevo is a rural locality (a village) in Yudinskoye Rural Settlement, Velikoustyugsky District, Vologda Oblast, Russia. The population was 3 as of 2002.

Geography 
Kulnevo is located 14 km northwest of Veliky Ustyug (the district's administrative centre) by road. Budrino is the nearest rural locality.

References 

Rural localities in Velikoustyugsky District